Fu Manchu / Fatso Jetson is a split 7-inch from 1998 featuring Fu Manchu and Fatso Jetson. The Fu Manchu side contains a cover of the Thin Lizzy song "Jailbreak".

Track listing

Fu Manchu
 "Jailbreak"

Fatso Jetson
 "Blueberries and Chrome"

The song "Jailbreak" was later released as a CD single with a different cover and two more songs: "Urethane" from The Action Is Go and a live version of "Coyote Duster" from the Dynamo Open Air. "Coyote Duster" was originally released on Daredevil. The version of "Jailbreak" that appears on the CD is also a remastered version.

CD track listing
 "Jailbreak"
 "Urethane"
 "Coyote Duster" (live)

"Jailbreak" was a "test recording" with J. Yuenger of White Zombie to determine if they would get along. (This was stated by Scott Hill in an interview.) They apparently did, as Yuenger later produced their album, The Action Is Go.

Both versions of "Jailbreak" are out of print.

References 

Fu Manchu (band) songs
Fatso Jetson albums